Jonas Björkman and Roger Federer were the defending champions but only Federer competed that year with Max Mirnyi.

Federer and Mirnyi won in the final 4–6, 6–3, [10–4] against Mark Knowles and Daniel Nestor.

Seeds
Champion seeds are indicated in bold text while text in italics indicates the round in which those seeds were eliminated.

 Mark Knowles /  Daniel Nestor (final)
 Joshua Eagle /  Sandon Stolle (quarterfinals)
 Petr Pála /  Pavel Vízner (quarterfinals)
 Yevgeny Kafelnikov /  Jeff Tarango (first round)

Draw

External links
 2002 ABN AMRO World Tennis Tournament Doubles draw

2002 ABN AMRO World Tennis Tournament
Doubles